Makati Shangri-La, Manila was a hotel located in Makati and one of the three hotels managed by Shangri-La Hotels and Resorts in Metro Manila, Philippines. Opening on April 27, 1993, the hotel had 696 rooms and suites at the time of its temporary closure in 2021. While the hotel has been closed, its two-level Shangri-La Retail Arcade, which hosts retail and office spaces at the ground and second levels, remains open.

History 
The Makati Shangri-La had its soft opening on April 27, 1993, with its grand launch held months later in August of the same year. It was developed by the Ayala family to keep the area as Manila's luxury address. Originally it opened with 703 rooms over its 28 floors, at a cost of $118 million.

The hotel underwent several renovations over the years, including 3 restaurant overhauls and the refurbishing of more than 200 rooms in 2001 with fiber optic cabling and broadband internet. The cost per room of the 2001 renovation was around $30,000. The entire renovation, which continued until the end of 2002, cost $130 million.

The Rizal ballroom was renovated in 2009. A second ballroom named "Isabela" opened in November 2013 with an aim to provide a modern event space with interchangeable furniture and audiovisual technology.

In 2010, the hotel embarked on a program called "Green Housekeeping" in order to reduce the use of chemicals and improve cleanliness, with initiatives like low-temperature washing and lower electricity use. The same year it was the first hotel in the Philippines to equip its concierge team with iPads.

In 2013, the hotel reportedly achieved an average 80 percent occupancy, most of which were corporate clients such as the United States Embassy.

Temporary closure 
The hotel was forced to close on February 1, 2021 due to financial losses caused by the COVID-19 pandemic, and thus initiated a mass layoff of its staff. It previously ceased operations for a brief period in early 2020 due to the lockdowns imposed by the national government, but the hotel was allowed to operate again after quarantine restrictions were eased.

Design and construction 
The hotel was designed by Kanko Kikaku Sekkeisha, Yozo Shibata & Association (Tokyo) & G. Formoso & Partners (Manila), both companies of which have designed multiple Shangri-La properties. During the 2002 renovations, General Manager Richard Riley directed and designed the amenities. The design team included specialists from the US, Hong Kong, Singapore and Tokyo, including Bilky Llinas, Leese Robertson Freeman Ltd., Warner Wong, Wilson Associates, BUZdesign, Adam Tihany, and Alan Chang.

Features

Rooms and suites
The hotel had 696 rooms in 8 types, including 46 Deluxe Suites and 3 Specialty Suites that overlooked Ayala Avenue, and 1 Presidential Suite, which measures .

Restaurants 
Makati Shangri-La had six restaurants and bars. It also had an in-house deli bakery called "Sinfully Circles by Makati Shangri-La".

Past the grand staircase at the lobby is Lobby Lounge. The venue was noted in 2013 for leading a popular phenomenon in Manila for people to drink British afternoon tea in the summertime.

Makati Shangri-La was judged as the overall winner in the professional division of Chefs on Parade in 2011, the longest cooking competition in the Philippines, and awarded the COP Presidential Trophy.

The hotel's other outlets included the Japanese restaurant Inagiku, Circles Event Cafe (an all-day dining restaurant), Shang Palace (Shangri-La's brand of Cantonese cuisine restaurant), Sage Bespoke Grill (formerly Red; the hotel's Pool Bar located at the fourth level), and Sage Bar (the hotel bar; previously known as Conway's).

Events 
The hotel had multiple ballrooms and event spaces, and added more throughout its operation, including the Isabela, named after Spain's Queen Isabella, in November 2013. The Isabela included works of art by Filipino painter RH Lascano, and was designed by Hong Kong-based LRF Design. The Makati Shangri-La was also the venue of the Star Magic Ball, an annual red carpet event that featured ABS-CBN artists. Later called the ABS-CBN Ball, it was held in the Rizal Ballroom.

See also 
 Shangri-La Hotels and Resorts

References

External links
Makati Shangri-La, Manila - Official Website

Hotels in Metro Manila
Defunct hotels
Buildings and structures in Makati
Makati Central Business District
Shangri-La Hotels and Resorts
Hotel buildings completed in 1993
1993 establishments in the Philippines
Hotels disestablished in 2021
2021 disestablishments in the Philippines